Porkpa District is one of five districts located in Grand Cape Mount County, Liberia. As of the 2008 Census, it has a population of  42,615, making it the most populated district of Grand Cape Mount County.

Districts of Liberia
Grand Cape Mount County